John Potter may refer to:

John Potter (American football) (born 1990), American football player
John Potter (bishop) (c. 1674–1747), Archbishop of Canterbury
John Potter (Conservative politician) (1873–1940), Member of Parliament for Eccles, 1931–1935
John Potter (cricketer) (born 1949), former English cricketer
John Potter (fencer) (1910–1991), American Olympic fencer
John Potter (footballer) (born 1979), Scottish footballer
Sir John Potter (Liberal politician) (1815–1858), Member of Parliament for Manchester, 1857–1858
John Potter (musician), English tenor and academic
John Potter (priest) (1713–1770), Dean of Canterbury, 1766–1770
John E. Potter (born 1956), United States Postmaster General
John F. Potter (1817–1899), U.S. Representative from Wisconsin
John Gerald Potter (1829–1908), English wallpaper manufacturer and art patron
John Lishman Potter (1834–1931), New Zealand goldminer, stonemason and builder
John M. Potter (1924–1993), Republican Party state legislator from Wisconsin
John William Potter (1918–2013), U.S. federal judge
John Potter Jr. (1821–1879), Greenback Party state legislator from Wisconsin
John Potter (writer) (fl. 1754–1804), English writer and composer
John Deane Potter (1912–1981), British journalist
John Potter (chemist) (1927–2017), English chemist who falsely claimed to be a Special Operations Executive agent
John Potter (racing driver) (born 1982), race car driver and race team owner
John Potter (Canadian politician) (1911–1985), member of the Legislative Assembly of New Brunswick
John Milton Potter (1906–1947), president of Hobart and William Smith Colleges

See also
Jack Potter (born 1938), Australian cricketer
Jon Potter (born 1963), field hockey player
Jonathan Potter (born 1956), British professor and originator of discursive psychology
Jonathan Potter (cricketer) (born 1971), English cricketer 
Jonathan Potter (computer programmer), Australian programmer